A lapidarium is a place where stone monuments and fragments of archaeological interest are exhibited.

They can include stone epigraphs; statues; architectural elements such as columns, cornices, and acroterions; bas reliefs, tombstones; and sarcophagi. 

Such collections are often displayed in the outdoor courtyards of archaeology museums and history museums.

A lapidary museum could either be a lapidarium or – less often – a gem museum (e.g. the Mineral and Lapidary Museum, North Carolina).

Examples 
 The Lapidarium (in the National Museum), Prague, Czechia
 The Lapidarium, Kerch, Crimea
 The Lapidarium of Kings, Copenhagen, Denmark 
 The  (museum-lapidarium of Maffei), Verona, Italy
 The Lapidary Museum, Avignon, France
 The Estense Lapidary Museum, Modena, Italy
 Split Archaeological Museum

See also 
 A glyptotheque, a sculpture museum, usually stone sculptures

References

External links